The Magpie is a 1958 Soviet drama film directed by Naum Trakhtenberg.

Plot 
The film takes place in Russia in the first half of the 19th century. The film tells about the successful actor Shchepin, visiting the theater of Prince Skalinsky, where he meets a gifted actress named Aneta.

Cast 
 Zinaida Kirienko as Aneta
 Nikolai Afanasyev as Shchepin (as N. Afanasyev)
 Vladimir Pokrovskiy as Knyaz (as V. Pokrovskiy)
 Viktor Korshunov as Stepan (as V. Korshunov)
 Anatoliy Kubatskiy as Ugryumov (as A. Kubatskiy)
 Sergei Kalinin as Upravlyayushchiy (as S. Kalinin)
 Aleksandr Grave as Naslednik (as V. Grave)
 Nikolai Shamin as Pomeshchik (as N. Shamin)

References

External links 
 

1958 films
1950s Russian-language films
Soviet drama films
1958 drama films